Aynaba, also spelt Ainabo, Ainaba or Aynabo is a major town in western Sool region of Somaliland as well as the administrative seat of the Aynaba District. Aynaba is known for its watering wells and for its good and abundant fresh water.

Overview

Aynaba is situated on a busy tarmac road connecting Somaliland's major cities to Somalia and is the second largest town in the Saraar region of Somaliland after Las Anod. The town is almost at the exact center between Burao and Las Anod, with the town being 127 km and 124 km away from both cities respectively. The name "Aynaba" or "Aynabo" translates to "black" in the Somali language.

Aynaba is home to the famous Aynaba Well, well known throughout Somaliland and among Somalis in general for its depth and abundant water, which attracts nomads from neighbouring Togdheer, Sanaag and Sool regions and has been the subject of many poems.

Ancient edifices have been found in Aynaba. Somaliland in general, is home to numerous such archaeological sites and megalithic structures, with similar rock art found at Haadh, Gudmo Biyo Cas, Dhambalin, Dhagah Maroodi and numerous other sites, while ancient edifices are, among others, found at Sheikh, Aw-Barkhadle, Ancient Amud, Heis, Maydh, Haylan, Qa’ableh, Qombo'ul and El Ayo. However, many of these old structures have yet to be properly explored, a process which would help shed further light on local history and facilitate their preservation for posterity.

History

19th century 
During the early to mid-19th century, Aynaba was the headquarters of the Soocane military faction led by the famous poet and military leader Kite Fiqi.

Dervish movement
The town was one of many temporary local centers that the Dervish movement operated from, led by the Mad Mullah's second in command Haji Sudi of the Adan Madoba subclan of the Habr Je'lo. The town was also the sight of clashes between the movement's Sufi tariqa, the Salihiyya and its rival, the Qadiriyya in 1955.

Guba series
Following a string of Habr Je'lo victories over the Dhulbahante after the collapse of the Dervish movement, in which they had captured many wells and reduced their opponents to a pitiful state, including expelling them from Aynaba and the wider Aynaba district, Salaan Carrabey composed a boastful poem dedicated to Aynaba called Haadaaqsi.

Drought

Between 1974 and 1975, a major drought referred to as the Abaartii Dabadheer ("The Lingering Drought") occurred in modern-day Somaliland and the neighbouring northern Puntland region of Somalia. The Soviet Union, which at the time maintained strategic relations with the Siad Barre government, airlifted some 90,000 people from the devastated regions of Aynaba and the towns of Beer and Hobyo. New small settlements referred to as Danwadaagaha ("Collective Settlements") were then created in Jubbada Hoose (Lower Jubba) and Jubbada Dhexe (Middle Jubba) regions. The transplanted families were also introduced to farming and fishing techniques, a change from their traditional pastoralist lifestyle of livestock herding.

Oil exploration 
The area Aynaba is located in is home to Block SL10B/13. In November 2019, Genel energy present estimation of block potential. It conclude the existence of active petroleum system and several stacked oil reserves within the block adding up to 1.3 billion barrels of oil. Full field development will have daily output of 50.000 barrels of oil. In December 2021, Genel Energy signed a farm-out deal with OPIC Somaliland Corporation, backed by Taiwan’s CPC Corporation, on the SL10B/13 block. According to Genel, the block could contain more than 5 billion barrels of prospective resources.

Demographics
In 2005, the town of Aynaba has a population of 75,702 residents. The town is inhabited by the Rer Yunis and Omar Jibril sub-divisions of the Habr Je'lo Isaaq.

Sites 
-Aynaba well

-Ruins of Aynaba

- markets and government offices

References

Sources
Aynabo, Somalia

Populated places in Sool, Somaliland